Carroll Milton Williams (December 2, 1916 in Oregon Hill, Virginia  October 11, 1991 in Watertown, Massachusetts) was an American zoologist known for his work in entomology and developmental biology—in particular, metamorphosis in insects, for which he won the George Ledlie Prize. He performed groundbreaking surgical experiments on larvae and pupae, and developed multiple new techniques, including the use of carbon dioxide as an anesthetic. His impact on entomology has been compared to that of Vincent Wigglesworth.

Education
Williams was educated at the University of Richmond  and Harvard University, where he was awarded a PhD in Zoology in 1941.  Elected to the Harvard Society of Fellows, he also earned an MD summa cum laude.

Career and research

For his thesis he studied the wingbeat frequency of Drosophila, using a stroboscopic device which he designed with the advice of Harold Edgerton.  

In 1942 Carroll Williams began a series of experiments that led to the solution of the mystery of metamorphosis. In the most famous one, he cut a pupae in half and connected the 2 half with a small tube, to study the effect of the lesions on the metamorphosis.

Next he studied the endocrine control of the development of the giant American silkworm Hyalophora cecropia, introducing carbon dioxide as a surgical anesthetic.  He showed that a hormone from the brain activated the prothoracic glands to release the  moulting hormone ecdysone.  When the juvenile hormone is present also, larvae moult to another larval stage.  Juvenile hormone is not present during the larval-to-pupal or the pupal-to-adult moults.   The pupae enter diapause which is broken when the brain has been chilled for weeks,  after which it releases the brain hormone.  Williams was the first to isolate juvenile hormone and ecdysone. With his students he studied cocoon-spinning behavior and the profound metabolic shutdown during diapause, and was the first to discover and isolate cocoonase and cytochrome b5, as well as the "paper factor". He subsequently proposed that hormonal analogues could be used as pesticides by disrupting the developmental cycles of insects.

Williams was the chairman of the biology department at Harvard University from 1959 to 1962, and the Benjamin Bussey Professor of Biology from 1966 until his retirement in 1987. He was a fellow of the American Academy of Arts and Sciences, and was elected to the National Academy of Sciences, where he was a member of the Academy's council for two terms and chairman of biological sciences for one. He was also a member of the Institute of Medicine, the Pontifical Academy of Sciences, and the American Philosophical Society.

References

20th-century American zoologists
American entomologists
1916 births
1991 deaths
Deaths from lymphoma
Harvard Graduate School of Arts and Sciences alumni
Harvard University faculty
University of Richmond alumni
Members of the National Academy of Medicine
Members of the Pontifical Academy of Sciences
Members of the United States National Academy of Sciences
Harvard Medical School alumni